Kronoskogen is a forest area between Ängelholm and Skälderviken in Sweden. It is 6 kilometers by 2 kilometers, and is partially a protected nature reserve. It is home to an unusual forest ecosystem due to its sandy soils and beach location.

See also

 UFO-Memorial Ängelholm

References

Geography of Skåne County